Mzukisi Sikali, (30 July 1971 – 16 September 2005), was a South African boxer who served as a world champion in three different weight categories: junior flyweight, flyweight, and super flyweight.

Murder
Sikali, who was regarded as one of South Africa's top boxers, was stabbed to death after he attempted to fight off a couple of muggers in Uitenhage, near Port Elizabeth. The muggers were arrested around an hour after the incident; and a mobile phone, which had been stolen from Sikali, was also recovered.

Pro career
The last contest that Sikali fought before his death was a unification bout against the Armenian fighter Vic Darchinyan, in which Sikali lost his IBO flyweight title after the fight was stopped in the eighth round. His professional record was twenty-nine wins (seventeen by KO), seven losses, and two draws.

See also 
List of boxing triple champions

External links

1971 births
2005 deaths
Flyweight boxers
Male murder victims
South African murder victims
People murdered in South Africa
Sportspeople from Port Elizabeth
South African male boxers